Valleraugue is a former commune in the Gard department in southern France. On 1 January 2019, it was merged into the new commune Val-d'Aigoual.

Geography
Valleraugue is located in a deep valley of the Cévennes mountains, on the river Hérault.

Population

Sights
Picturesque medieval town, 26 bridges, most of them several centuries old.

Weather station
The Mont Aigoual weather station is located on the territory of the commune.

Personalities
Valleraugue was the birthplace of:
 Jean Louis Armand de Quatrefages de Bréau (1810–1892), naturalist was born at Berthézène, which is part of Valleraugue
 Francois Perrier (1835–1888), Brigadier-general and commander of the Légion d'honneur

See also
Communes of the Gard department

References

Former communes of Gard
Populated places disestablished in 2019